The phosphatidylinositol-4,5-bisphosphate 3-kinase, catalytic subunit alpha (the HUGO-approved official symbol = PIK3CA; HGNC ID, HGNC:8975), also called p110α protein, is a class I PI 3-kinase catalytic subunit. The human p110α protein is encoded by the PIK3CA gene.

Its role was uncovered by molecular pathological epidemiology (MPE).

Function 

Phosphatidylinositol-4,5-bisphosphate 3-kinase (also called phosphatidylinositol 3-kinase (PI3K)) is composed of an 85 kDa regulatory subunit and a 110 kDa catalytic subunit. The protein encoded by this gene represents the catalytic subunit, which uses ATP to phosphorylate phosphatidylinositols (PtdIns), PtdIns4P and PtdIns(4,5)P2.

The involvement of p110α in human cancer has been hypothesized since 1995. Support for this hypothesis came from genetic and functional studies, including the discovery of common activating PIK3CA missense mutations in common human tumors. It has been found to be oncogenic and is implicated in cervical cancers. PIK3CA mutations are present in over one-third of breast cancers, with enrichment in the luminal and in human epidermal growth factor receptor 2-positive subtypes (HER2 +). The three hotspot mutation positions (GLU542, GLU545, and HIS1047) have been widely reported till date. While substantial preclinical data show an association with robust activation of the pathway and resistance to common therapies, clinical data do not indicate that such mutations are associated with high levels of pathway activation or with a poor prognosis. It is unknown whether the mutation predicts increased sensitivity to agents targeting the P3K pathway.

PIK3CA participates in a complex interaction within the tumor microenvironment in this phenomenon.

Clinical characteristics 

Due to the association between p110α and cancer, it may be an appropriate drug target. Pharmaceutical companies are designing and characterizing potential p110α isoform specific inhibitors.

The presence of [a] PIK3CA mutation may predict response to aspirin therapy for colorectal cancer.

Somatic activating mutations in PIK3CA are found in Klippel–Trénaunay syndrome and venous malformation.

PIK3CA-associated segmental overgrowth includes brain disorders such as macrocephaly-capillary malformation (MCAP) and hemimegalencephaly. It is also associated with congenital, lipomatous overgrowth of vascular malformations, epidermal nevi and skeletal/spinal anomalies (CLOVES syndrome) and fibroadipose hyperplasia (FH). The conditions are caused by heterozygous (usually somatic mosaic) mutations.

Inhibition 
All PI 3-kinases are inhibited by the drugs wortmannin and LY294002 but wortmannin shows better efficiency than LY294002 on the hotspot mutation positions.

Pharmacology 
In September 2017 Copanlisib, inhibiting predominantly p110α and p110δ, got FDA approval for the treatment of adult patients with relapsed follicular lymphoma (FL) who have received at least two prior systemic therapies.

See also 
Phosphoinositide 3-kinase
Phosphoinositide 3-kinase inhibitor
PIK3CA-related overgrowth spectrum

Interactions 

P110α has been shown to interact with:

 ARHGEF1, 
 ADAP1, 
 DGKZ, 
 HRAS, and
 Lck.

References

Further reading 

 
 
 
 

EC 2.7.1